is Maaya Sakamoto's seventeenth single. The title track was used as the ending theme for the mecha anime Linebarrels of Iron.

Track listing

Charts

External links
Special Site

References

2008 singles
2008 songs
Maaya Sakamoto songs
Songs written by Maaya Sakamoto
Victor Entertainment singles
Anime songs